Eric Muchangi Njiru Karemba (born 24 1984) is a Kenyan politician and a businessman, and currently the Member of Parliament (MNA) for Runyenjes Constituency,  serving a second term and also the Chairman of the Labour and Social Affairs committee. Runyenjes is in Embu County in Eastern part of Kenya. Karemba belongs to the United Democratic Alliance party under the Kenya Kwanza alliance led by the current and the fifth president of Kenya Dr William Ruto. He is a graduate of Kenyatta university with a Bachelors of Education and was a student leader at the same university. Karemba made history by becoming the first Akorino MP in the history of Kenya. Karemba currently serves as the Chairman of the Labor and Social Affairs committee of the National Assembly.

Political career 
Karemba is a member of the United Democratic Alliance which is the leading party in Kenya under the president William Ruto, where he won with a landslide with 50,519 votes against his closest competitor Simba who had just above 11,000 votes. Previously, Karemba belonged to Jubilee party, under President Uhuru Kenyatta. He is now a member of United Democratic Alliance under William Ruto.

Karemba vied for the Runyenjes constituency parliamentary seat in 2013 under Alliance Party of Kenya party and lost narrowly to Cecily Mbarire who is now the current governor of Embu County. He vied again in 2017 under Jubilee and won the election garnering 59,447 votes against his close competitor who had 5,184 votes. In parliament, Karemba was a sitting member of the education committee. He also served as a member of the Library and ICT committee of the National Assembly. He is currently the Chairman of the Labour Committee of the Kenyan National Assembly and also a member of the Liaison Committee composed of all chairpersons.  Karemba is a close confidant of President Dr. William Ruto.

Personal life 
Karemba is married to Martha Kariuki.

Education

Karemba went to Kiangungi primary DEB school and then to Kegonge secondary school where he sat his KCSE. Karemba is a graduate from Kenyatta University with a Bachelor of Education Arts He then joined Mount Kenya University for a Master of Arts in public administration.

References 

Living people
People from Embu County
21st-century Kenyan politicians
Jubilee Party politicians
Kenyatta University alumni
Members of the National Assembly (Kenya)
Mount Kenya University alumni
1984 births